Cymindis violacea is a species of ground beetle in the subfamily Harpalinae. It was described by Maximilien Chaudoir in 1873.

References

violacea
Beetles described in 1873